Henry Herrward Mauz Jr. (born May 4, 1936) is a retired United States Navy admiral and the former Commander in Chief, United States Atlantic Fleet from 1992 to 1994.

Military career
After graduating from the United States Naval Academy in 1959, Mauz went on to serve in Vietnam, operating river patrol boats along the Mekong Delta. He went on to command a minesweeper, the guided missile destroyer , and the guided missile cruiser  (1980–1982).

Mauz served as commander of the United States Seventh Fleet from 1988 to 1990, and in August 1990 assumed command of all United States Naval forces in the Persian Gulf.

Mauz retired from active duty in 1994 as Commander-in-Chief, United States Atlantic Fleet. A 1965 graduate of the Naval Postgraduate School, he was President of the Naval Postgraduate School Foundation, and currently serves on its board. Mauz's education includes the Naval Academy, Naval War College, a graduate degree in electrical engineering from the Naval Postgraduate School, and a Master of Business Administration from Auburn University.

Awards and honors

He is a Companion of the Naval Order of the United States, and was inducted into the Naval Postgraduate School Hall of Fame on November 19, 2003.

Retirement controversy
Although retired as a full admiral, Mauz's retirement was delayed by Congress due to allegations he mishandled sexual harassment complaints. Senator Patty Murray (D-WA) was chiefly responsible for the delay. In a letter to her, Mauz stated:

You have commented on the need to hold our senior officers accountable. I suggest that a U.S. senator has the same code and that in the case of your actions during my confirmation you should also be held accountable. You showed little interest in the truth.

Mauz was later confirmed by a vote of 92–6 in favor of allowing him to retire at 4-star rank.

Post retirement
Mauz is on the Board of Advisors for Genex Technologies, the Board of Directors of CNF Inc., the Board of Directors of Texas Industries, and the Advisory Council of Northrop Grumman Ship Systems, and is a Senior Fellow at the Center for Civil Military Relations at the Naval Postgraduate School.

On March 27, 2015, retired Adm. Henry H. Mauz Jr., class of 1959 was awarded the 2015 Naval Academy Alumni Association Distinguished Graduate Award. 

He is also a member at Cypress Point Club.

References

1936 births
Living people
United States Navy admirals
United States Naval Academy alumni
United States Navy personnel of the Vietnam War
Recipients of the Navy Distinguished Service Medal
Recipients of the Legion of Merit
Recipients of the Order of the Rising Sun
Recipients of the Meritorious Service Decoration
Recipients of the Ordre national du Mérite
Naval Postgraduate School alumni
Auburn University alumni
Recipients of the Defense Superior Service Medal